The Petaluma Historic Commercial District is a  historic district in Petaluma, California which was listed on the National Register of Historic Places in 1995.  It is located along Petaluma Boulevard, between B St. and Prospect St.

It includes Italianate and Classical Revival architecture amongst its 63 contributing buildings and one contributing object.

It includes:
Old Petaluma Opera House, at 147-149 Kentucky St., which is separately listed on the National Register.
Herold Building, which has "a corner tower and bay windows"
American Trust Building, a "carefully executed example of a classically designed bank from the 1920s"
Hotel Petaluma, "the district's tallest building and the only one designed in the Mediterranean Revival style"
Couches, Etc., a "three-story former department store that has a rounded corner and other features of the Streamline Moderne".
Masonic Building (1882), 43-49 Petaluma Blvd. N., 7/9 Western Ave. Brick building with cast iron detailing, Italianate in style.
McNear Building (1911), 23 Petaluma Blvd North.

See also
Petaluma, California#History

References

External links

Historic districts on the National Register of Historic Places in California
National Register of Historic Places in Sonoma County, California